is a passenger railway station on the Kawagoe Line located in the city of Kawagoe, Saitama, Japan, operated by the East Japan Railway Company (JR East).

Lines
In the morning peak, some eastbound trains towards Tokyo and some westbound trains toward  and  start from this station, as it is located close to Kawagoe Depot. Services operate every 20 minutes during the daytime.

Station layout

The station consists of one side platform and one island platform serving three tracks, connected to the station building by a footbridge. The station building and entrance is located on the south side of the tracks. The station is staffed.

Platforms

History
Minami-Furuya Station opened on 22 July 1940. The line was electrified on 30 September 1985, from which date through-running began to and from the Saikyo Line. With the privatization of Japanese National Railways (JNR) on 1 April 1987, the station came under the control of JR East.

Passenger statistics
In fiscal 2019, the station was used by an average of 8474 passengers daily (boarding passengers only). The passenger figures for previous years are as shown below.

Surrounding area

 JR East Kawagoe Depot
 Toho College of Music
 Kawagoe Tax Office
 Unicus Minami-Furuya Shopping Centre

See also
 List of railway stations in Japan

References

External links

 JR East station information 

Railway stations in Saitama Prefecture
Railway stations in Japan opened in 1940
Kawagoe Line
Stations of East Japan Railway Company
Railway stations in Kawagoe, Saitama